Grevillea humifusa, commonly known as spreading grevillea, is a species of flowering plant in the family Proteaceae and is endemic to a restricted area of the south-west of Western Australia. It is a prostrate shrub with long, trailing stems, divided lives with linear lobes and clusters of pink to pale red and cream-coloured flowers with a reddish, yellow-tipped style.

Description

Taxonomy
Grevillea humifusa was first formally described in 1994 by Peter M. Olde and Neil R. Marriott in The Grevillea Book, from specimens collected by Olde near Eneabba in 1991. The specific epithet (humifusa) means "procumbent".

Distribution and habitat
Spreading grevillea is only known from a single population of about 1500 plants near Eneabba, where it grows in disturbed, open low woodland with Kennedia prostrata, species of Jacksonia, and Dianella revoluta. The land that the 1500 plants are found on comprises private pasture and adjoining road reserves.

Conservation status
Grevillea humifusa is listed as "endangered" under the Australian Government Environment Protection and Biodiversity Conservation Act 1999 and as "threatened" by the Western Australian Government Department of Biodiversity, Conservation and Attractions, meaning that it is in danger of extinction.

Use in horticulture
Grevillea humifusa is cultivated as an ornamental plant and features dense, silvery-grey foliage contrasting with the flowers. It can be grown in most well-drained soil and is drought- and frost-tolerant.

See also
 List of Grevillea species

References

humifusa
Eudicots of Western Australia
Proteales of Australia
Garden plants of Australia
Groundcovers
Plants described in 1994